San Martín de Pusa is a municipality located in the province of Toledo, Castile-La Mancha, Spain. According to the 2006 census (INE), the municipality has a population of 825 inhabitants.

References

External links 
San Martín de Pusa Site

Municipalities in the Province of Toledo